Battle of Misrata may refer to:

 Battle of Misrata (1912), during the Italo-Turkish War
 Battle of Misrata (2011), during the 2011 Libyan Civil War (February to May)

See also
 Battle of the Misrata frontline, during the 2011 Libyan Civil War (May to August)